Fourth Of July  was an indie rock band from Lawrence, Kansas. Frontman Brendan Hangauer began writing eventual Fourth of July songs as early as 1999—initially with a solo project in mind—but the band came together and began performing live in 2002. They are currently with Range Life Records. The band consists of Brendan Hangauer (vocals, guitar), Patrick Hangauer (bass), Kelly Hangauer (keys, trumpet, vocals), Brian Costello (drums), Brendan Costello (guitar). Some of their early marketing push came through posting their videos on YouTube.

Discography
Fourth of July on the Plains (2007 · Range Life)
Before Our Hearts Explode! (2010 · Range Life)
Empty Moon (2013 · High Dive)

References

External links
Fourth Of July on Facebook

Indie rock musical groups from Kansas
Musicians from Lawrence, Kansas